Nunes is a common Portuguese surname, originally a patronymic meaning "son of Nuno". The Spanish variant is Núñez.

Notable people with the name

Business, arts, entertainment, and media
 Clara Nunes (1942-1983), Brazilian samba musician
 Emmanuel Nunes (1941-2012), Portuguese composer
 Julia Nunes (born 1989), American singer and songwriter
 José Maurício Nunes Garcia (1767-1830), Brazilian classical composer
 Lygia Bojunga Nunes (born 1932), Brazilian author of children's books
 Neil Nunes (born 1980), British continuity announcer
 Pedro Nunes (1502-1578), Portuguese mathematician, cosmographer, and professor
 Rachel Ann Nunes (born 1966), or Teyla Branton or Rachel Branton, or Mrs. Antonio Joao (TJ) Nunes, United States author of children's books
 Sara Nunes (born 1980), Finnish pop singer
 Vasco Nunes (1974-2016), Portuguese cinematographer, producer, and film director

Religion
 Emanuel Nunes Carvalho (1771-1817), United States rabbi and lexicographer
 Airas Nunes (c. 1230-1293), Spanish cleric and troubador
 José da Costa Nunes (1880-1976), Portuguese Catholic Cardinal, former Bishop of Macau and Patriarch of the East Indies

Sports 
 Adão Nunes Dornelles (1923-1991), Brazilian footballer
 Agnaldo Nunes (born 1976), Brazilian boxer
 Alessandro Mori Nunes (born 1979), Brazilian footballer
 Alessandro Nunes (born 1982), Brazilian footballer
 Amanda Nunes (born 1988), Brazilian mixed martial artist
 André Nunes (born 1984), Brazilian footballer
 Diego Nunes (born 1986), Brazilian racing driver
 Diego Nunes (fighter) (born 1982), Brazilian mixed martial artist
 Eduardo Martins Nunes (born 1984), Brazilian footballer
 Emerson Pereira Nunes (born 1981), Brazilian footballer
 Hugo Nunes Coelho (born 1980), Portuguese footballer
 João Batista Nunes (born 1954), Brazilian footballer
 Jorge Amado Nunes (born 1961), Paraguayan footballer
 José Carlos Araújo Nunes (born 1977), Portuguese footballer
 Josh Nunes (born 1990), Stanford football quarterback
 Karl Nunes (1894-1958), West Indian cricketer
 Laís Nunes (born 1992), Brazilian wrestler
 Paulo Jorge Carreira Nunes (born 1970), Portuguese footballer
 Paulo Nunes (born 1971), Brazilian footballer
 Ricardo Nunes, (born June 1986) South African footballer 
 Tomané Nunes (born 1987), Portuguese footballer
 Valmir Nunes (born 1964), Brazilian ultramarathon runner
 Vinícius Alberto Nunes (born 1988), Brazilian footballer

Other fields
 Benedito Nunes (1929-2011), Brazilian philosopher and writer
 Claudio Nunes (born 1968), Italian bridge player
 Pedro Nunes (1502-1578), 16th century mathematician
 Devin Nunes (born 1973), United States politician
 Terezinha Nunes (born 1947), British-Brazilian clinical psychologist and academic

Other uses
 Instituto Pedro Nunes, non-profit private organization for innovation and technology transfer based in Coimbra, Portugal

See also 
  Núñez, the Spanish version of the name

Portuguese-language surnames
Patronymic surnames
Surnames from given names